Xi Meijuan is a Chinese film, television and stage actress. She is a member of the 12th National People's Congress.

Filmography

References

External links
 

1955 births
Living people
Chinese film actresses
Actresses from Shanghai
Delegates to the 12th National People's Congress
Chinese television actresses
20th-century Chinese actresses
21st-century Chinese actresses
Chinese stage actresses
Shanghai Theatre Academy alumni